Phryganopsis flavicosta is a moth in the subfamily Arctiinae. It was described by George Hampson in 1901. It is found in the Democratic Republic of the Congo and Sierra Leone.

References

Moths described in 1901
Lithosiini